The 2019–20 Cupa României was the 82nd season of the annual Romanian primary football knockout tournament. The winner will qualify for the first qualifying round of the 2020–21 UEFA Europa League. Times up to 26 October 2019 and from 29 March 2020 are EEST (UTC+3). Times between 27 October 2019 and 28 March 2020 are EET (UTC+2).

Participating clubs
The following 145 teams qualified for the competition:

Round and draw dates

Source:

Preliminary rounds

The first rounds, and any preliminaries, are organised by the Regional Leagues.

First round
All matches were played on 31 July 2019.

|colspan="3" style="background-color:#97DEFF"|31 July 2019

|}

Second round
All matches were played on 14 and 15 August 2019.

|colspan="3" style="background-color:#97DEFF"|14 August 2019

|-
|colspan="3" style="background-color:#97DEFF"|15 August 2019

|}

Third round
All matches were played on 27, 28 and 29 August 2019.

|colspan="3" style="background-color:#97DEFF"|27 August 2019

|-
|colspan="3" style="background-color:#97DEFF"|28 August 2019

|-
|colspan="3" style="background-color:#97DEFF"|29 August 2019

|}

Fourth round
All matches were played on 10 and 11 September 2019.

|colspan="3" style="background-color:#97DEFF"|10 September 2019

|-
|colspan="3" style="background-color:#97DEFF"|11 September 2019

|}

Round of 32
The matches were played on 24, 25 and 26 September 2019.

Round of 16
The matches were played on 29, 30 and 31 October 2019.

Quarter-finals
The matches were played on 3, 4 and 5 March 2020.

Semi-finals
The semi-final matches are played in a round-trip system. The first legs will be played on 24 June 2020 and the second legs will be played on 8 July 2020.

|}

1st leg

2nd leg

Final

References

 
Romania
Cupa României seasons